Clockwork Prince is a 2011 novel written by Cassandra Clare. It is the second novel in The Infernal Devices trilogy and is written through the perspective of the protagonist, Tessa Gray, who lives at the London Institute among Shadowhunters, a group of half-angel/half-human beings called Nephilim. After the recent failings of Charlotte, the head of the London Institute, the Council of Shadowhunters begin to question her ability to lead. Now Tessa and her friends must find Mortmain – an evil industrialist bent on destroying all the Nephilim in the world – or risk losing control of the Institute.

The book also contains many quotes referring to famous pieces of Victorian literature, for example, Alfred Tennyson's The Palace of Art, Charles Dickens' A Tale of Two Cities, and the works of Samuel Taylor Coleridge.

A sequel to Clockwork Prince, titled Clockwork Princess, was released on March 19, 2013.

Plot
After the events of the previous book, Charlotte Branwell, accompanied by her husband Henry, Tessa Gray, Will Herondale, Jem Carstairs, and Jessamine Lovelace, are called to a Shadowhunters' Council meeting to give testimony regarding her failure to capture Axel Mortmain, the leader of the Pandemonium Club. Benedict Lightwood, who holds a grudge against Granville Fairchild, Charlotte's father, persuades Consul Wayland to give Charlotte an ultimatum: unless she is able to capture Mortmain within two weeks, she will have to resign as head of the London Institute. To further increase the defense of the Institute, Benedict's two sons, Gideon and Gabriel, will be assigned as self-defense tutors for Tessa, Jessamine, and Sophie Collins. however, Jessamine refuses to attend the training.

The Institute begins searching for Mortmain and discovers that his adoptive warlock father, John Shade, the creator of the automatons, and mother, Anne, were killed by the Clave before the Accords were signed. Charlotte suspects that Mortmain began a revenge campaign against the Clave after he unsuccessfully filed for Reparations. She sends Tessa, Will, and Jem to question Aloysius Starkweather of the York Institute, the Shadowhunter who executed Shade. While in York, Will finds out that his family, including his sister Cecily are living in Ravenscar Manor, owned by Mortmain. An automaton attacks the trio and warns Will to stay put unless he wants to see his loved ones killed. During the pursuit, an automaton was close enough to kill Tessa before her clockwork angel sprung to action.

Upon returning to London empty-handed, Will confesses to Magnus Bane that he ran away from home and emotionally shut himself from everyone to escape a curse caused by a demon he unwittingly released from his father's Pyxis box, which preys on his loved ones, the first being his sister Ella. He pleads to Magnus to summon the demon. As Will's mental state deteriorates, he stops returning home and Magnus mails a letter for Tessa to search for him. She and Jem find a drugged Will in an ifrit den and carry him back home. Tessa comforts a frustrated Jem and they share a heated moment where Jem almost confesses his feelings for Tessa. They ignore each other painfully. Will explains the next day during breakfast that he found information about werewolves eating yin fen, the drug Jem depends to survive. Upon getting a negative response from Woolsey Scott, head of London's werewolf pack, Charlotte suspects that Mortmain hired rogue werewolves to work on his automatons. 

Gideon becomes close with Sophie throughout their training and reveals to Tessa the reason why Benedict hates the Fairchild's: his uncle Silas committed suicide after his forbidden relationship with his parabatai was outed by Granville, leading to his mother Barbara dying in despair. Tessa learns from Sophie that Jessamine is seeing her brother, Nate, who invited her for a ball held in the Lightwood manor. Sophie had snatched the invitation and knocked out Jessamine, giving Tessa the opportunity to attend a ball disguised as her. Accompanied by Will, the two learn that Benedict is in a relationship with a demon, and is conspiring with Mortmain and Nate to bring down Charlotte. At the Manor, Will and Tessa share an urgent and desiring kiss, following which Magnus interrupts them and reveals that their drinks were spiked with some warlock powder. Will spots Marbas, the demon who had cursed him, and takes off after him. 

Charlotte summons the Silent Brothers to detain Jessamine and interrogate her using the Mortal Sword, after which she is imprisoned in Silent City. Tessa and Jem, after making up to each other, reach Jessamine's prison and persuade her to betray Nate by arranging for a meeting. However, Nate figures out the plan and brings an automaton to even out the battle. He tells Tessa that they are actually cousins: his biological mother was Aunt Harriet, who passed him up as Elizabeth's son to hide the shame that he was conceived out of wedlock. Tessa successfully tricks the automaton to turn on Nate and eventually kill him, but Will is gravely injured in the process. After Will recovers, he goes to Magnus, having broken up with Camille Belcourt and now living with Woolsey, to face Marbas. To his shock, Will is told by Marbas that there was never any curse and Ella died simply because of the wound she sustained while defending Will from him. 

Just two days before the deadline to capture Mortmain, Sophie relays Charlotte information she gained from Gideon about the truth of his mother and uncle's deaths: Barbara Lightwood had contracted demon pox from Benedict -- thanks to his interaction with demons -- and committed suicide because of it, while Silas' suicide had nothing to do with the Fairchild's at all. Charlotte uses this information to blackmail Benedict into dropping his challenge, but Gideon is banished from the Lightwood manor, finding refuge in the London Institute. Will confesses his love for Tessa, only for her to tell him that she had accepted Jem's marriage proposal. The two announce their engagement while at the party celebrating Charlotte's acquittal, during which she also reveals that she is pregnant with Henry's child. Out of nowhere, Cecily Herondale visits the Institute and demands that she be trained as a Shadowhunter.

References

External links

 Mortal Instruments
 The Infernal Devices

2010 American novels
American young adult novels
Young adult fantasy novels
Novels set in London
Fiction set in 1878
2010 fantasy novels
Margaret K. McElderry books